La liberazione di Ruggiero dall'isola d'Alcina (En. "The Liberation of Ruggiero from the island of Alcina") is a comic opera in four scenes by Francesca Caccini, first performed 3 February 1625 at the Villa di Poggio Imperiale in Florence, with a libretto by  based on Ludovico Ariosto's Orlando Furioso. It is the first opera written by a woman and was long considered to be the first Italian opera to be performed outside of Italy. It was performed to celebrate the visit of Prince Władysław of Poland during Carnival 1625, and it was revived in Warsaw in 1628. The work was commissioned by her employer Regent Archduchess Maria Maddalena of Austria, wife of Cosimo II de' Medici. Ruggiero was printed under the protection of Maria Magdalena in 1625, only five years after the first printed opera in Italy. It is the only opera by Francesca Caccini to survive.

La liberazione di Ruggiero is written in the stile moderno, that is, the style of Claudio Monteverdi, although the work owes more perhaps to the work of Jacopo Peri. It uses the new stile recitativo, as well as canzonettas in the style of the concerto delle donne. The opera's orchestration calls for a lirone, and somewhat remarkably for the period the cast does not require a castrato. The piece is balanced towards higher voices, with six sopranos, two altos, seven tenors, and only one bass, as well as a trio of recorders. A compositional scheme is used within the work that associates flat keys with the feminine (the female protagonist Alcina and her attendants) and sharp keys with the masculine (the male protagonist Ruggiero and the other male roles). The sorceress Melissa, who also appears in male disguise, is presented in the key of C major. Alcina is an evil and sexual sorceress, whereas Melissa is good. Melissa fights to free Ruggiero from Alcina's spells.

The work has been recorded and has been revived a number of times, including in Cologne (1983), Ferrara (1987), Stockholm (1990), Minneapolis (1991), Düdingen (Switzerland), Regensburg, Neuburg an der Donau (Germany) (1999), Brighton Early Music Festival 2015 (recorded by BBC Radio 3), Marseille (France) (2017, recorded by Radio Classique), and Boston Early Music Festival as Alcina (2018).

Recordings
La liberazione di Ruggiero dall'isola d'Alcina directed by Wladyslaw Klosiewicz, with the Warsaw Chamber Opera and Musica Antique Collegium Varsoviense. B000FEW8LA
La liberazione di Ruggiero dall'isola d'Alcina by Ensemble Renaissance on Sorabia Records
La liberazione di Ruggiero dall'isola d'Alcina directed by Elena Sartori, with ensembles Allabastrina and La Pifarescha. Glossa 2016
La liberazione di Ruggiero dall'isola d'Alcina (first recording of the complete opera including reconstructed instrumental dances) directed by Paul Van Nevel, with Huelgas Ensemble. Deutsche Harmonia Mundi 2018

Notes

References

Sources
 Cusick, Suzanne G., "Francesca Caccini", Grove Music Online, ed. L. Macy (Retrieved 20 May 2006), grovemusic.com (subscription access). (Grove Opera article)
Librettos
 La liberazione di Ruggiero. Ed. Doris Silbert. Northampton, MA. Smith College Archives, 1945. (piano-vocal score with introduction)
 La liberazione di Ruggiero. Ed. Brian Clark. www.primalamusica.com 2006 (Full score for sale, with performing materials).

External links
 Vanderbilt University course
"Synopsis", Gilbert Blin, Boston Early Music Festival
"Francesca Caccini’s creation of Alcina", Stephen Stubs, Boston Early Music Festival

Operas by Francesca Caccini
Italian-language operas
1625 operas
Operas
Operas based on works by Ludovico Ariosto